Probable ribosome biogenesis protein NEP1 or EMG1 is a protein that in humans is encoded by the EMG1 gene. A D86G mutation in the protein has been associated with Bowen-Conradi syndrome.

References

Further reading